Brigitte Albrecht-Loretan (born Brigitte Albrecht, 6 October 1970) is a retired Swiss cross-country skier who competed from 1992 to 2002. She won a bronze medal in the 4 × 5 km relay at the 2002 Winter Olympics in Salt Lake City and had her best individual finish with a seventh place in the 30 km event at the 1998 Winter Olympics in Nagano.

Albrecht-Loretan's best finish at the FIS Nordic World Ski Championships was an 11th in the 15 km event in 1999. She also has twenty victories at various levels in her career from 1995 to 2002.

Cross-country skiing results
All results are sourced from the International Ski Federation (FIS).

Olympic Games
 1 medal – (1 bronze)

World Championships

a.  Cancelled due to extremely cold weather.

World Cup

Season standings

Team podiums

 1 victory – (1 ) 
 2 podiums – (2 )

References

External links
 
 
 

1970 births
Living people
Swiss female cross-country skiers
Cross-country skiers at the 1992 Winter Olympics
Cross-country skiers at the 1994 Winter Olympics
Cross-country skiers at the 1998 Winter Olympics
Cross-country skiers at the 2002 Winter Olympics
Olympic bronze medalists for Switzerland
Olympic cross-country skiers of Switzerland
Olympic medalists in cross-country skiing
Medalists at the 2002 Winter Olympics
20th-century Swiss women
21st-century Swiss women